The 1927 Dartmouth Indians football team was an American football team that represented Dartmouth College as an independent during the 1927 college football season. In their fifth season under head coach Jesse Hawley, the Indians compiled a 7–1 record. Robert MacPhail was the team captain.

Myles Lane was the team's leading scorer, with 125 points, from 18 touchdowns and 17 kicked extra points.

Dartmouth played its home games at Memorial Field on the college campus in Hanover, New Hampshire.

Schedule

References

Dartmouth
Dartmouth Big Green football seasons
Dartmouth Indians football